2015 World Masters Athletics Championships is the 21st in a series of World Masters Athletics Outdoor Championships
that took place in Lyon, France from 4 to 16 August 2015.

This was the last odd year of the biennial Championships; beginning in 2016, the Championships will be held in even-numbered years.

The change was made to avoid conflict with the quadrennial World Masters Games, which had been held in odd-numbered years since 2005.

The main venue was Stade de Balmont (Stade de La Duchère).

Supplemental venues included Stade du Rhône (Stade de Parilly) for road races and throwing events,

the newly resurfaced Stade Pierre Duboeuf in Bron,

the newly resurfaced Stade Laurent Gérin in Vénissieux,

and Halle d'athlétisme Stéphane-Diagana as the Centre d'Information Technique.

This Championships was organized by World Masters Athletics (WMA) in coordination with a Local Organising Committee (LOC) led by Marcel Ferrari, Ligue d'Athlétisme Rhône-Alpes (Athlé).

The WMA is the global governing body of the sport of athletics for athletes 35 years of age or older, setting rules for masters athletics competition.

In addition to a full range of track and field events,

non-stadia events included 8K Cross Country, 10K Race Walk, 20K Race Walk, Half Marathon

and Marathon.

Results
Official results are archived at Athlé.

Past Championships results are archived at WMA.

Additional archives are available from British Masters Athletic Federation

in HTML format,

and from European Masters Athletics

as a searchable pdf.

Race Walk results are archived at Swiss Walking.

The "8000 Meter Run" published in the result archives should actually be "8K Cross Country", 
so the world records listed at WMA may have been incorrectly recorded, as every age group winner was reported as setting a world record and none of these records are documented in List of masters world records in road running. A similar clerical error is in 2010 World Masters Athletics Indoor Championships.

Top medal winners are listed only for selected events.

100 Meters

200 Meters

400 Meters

800 Meters

1500 Meters

5000 Meters

10,000 Meters

80 Meters Hurdles

100 Meters Hurdles

110 Meters Hurdles

200 Meters Hurdles

300 Meters Hurdles

400 Meters Hurdles

2000 Meters Steeplechase

3000 Meters Steeplechase

4 x 100 Meters Relay

4 x 400 Meters Relay

Long Jump

Triple Jump

High Jump

Pole Vault

Shot Put

Discus Throw

Hammer Throw

Weight Throw

Javelin Throw

Decathlon

Heptathlon

Throws Pentathlon

5000 Meters Race Walk

10000 Meters Race Walk

20000 Meters Race Walk

8000 Meters Cross Country

Half Marathon

References

External links

World Masters Athletics Championships
World Masters Athletics Championships
International athletics competitions hosted by France
World Masters Athletics Championships
Masters athletics (track and field) records